Judah ben Solomon Canpanton (14th century) was a Jewish ethical writer and philosopher. He was a student of Yom Tov b. Abraham Ishbili. He authored the work Arba'ah Kinyanim, which has been published, while other books remain in manuscript.

References

Year of birth missing
Year of death missing
14th-century Jews
Jewish philosophers
Jewish writers